Odorrana versabilis is a species of frog in the family Ranidae that is endemic to China.

Its natural habitats are subtropical or tropical moist lowland forests, subtropical or tropical moist montane forests, and rivers. It is not considered threatened by the IUCN.

References

Amphibians of China
versabilis
Amphibians described in 1962
Endemic fauna of China
Taxonomy articles created by Polbot